The 1969 Individual Speedway World Championship was the 24th edition of the official World Championship to determine the world champion rider.

The final was sponsored by the Sunday Mirror and held at Wembley. Ivan Mauger retained his title and won £1,000 in prize money. Barry Briggs finished second again after beating Sören Sjösten in a run-off for silver.

Format changes
The format of the Championship changed again for the 1969 event. This time the Swedish riders were pooled with the Continental and European sections that would provide 10 riders for the World Final, while the British and Commonwealth riders would supply 6 riders for the World Final to be held at Wembley Stadium in London.

First round
British/Commonwealth Qualifying - 16 to British/Commonwealth Final
Scandinavian Qualifying - 16 to Nordic Final
Continental Qualifying - 16 to Continental Final

British Qualifying

Scandinavian Qualifying

Continental Qualifying

Second round
Nordic Final - 8 to European Final
Continental Final - 8 to European Final

Nordic Final
 June 4, 1969
 Linköping
 First 8 to European Final

Continental Final
 June 27, 1969
  Ufa
 First 8 to European Final plus 1 reserve

Third round
European Final - 10 to World Final
British/Commonwealth Final - 6 to World Final

British/Commonwealth Final
 August 5, 1969
 West Ham
 First 6 to World Final plus 1 reserve

European Final
 August 24, 1969
  Olching
 First 10 to World Final plus 1 reserve

World Final
September 13, 1969
 London, Wembley Stadium

References

1969
Individual Speedway World Championship
Individual Speedway World Championship
Individual Speedway World Championship
Speedway competitions in the United Kingdom